The Theatre Museum Canada was founded by Herbert Whittaker in 1982, for the purpose of preserving and celebrating Canada's theatrical cultural heritage. The museum's honorary patron is Christopher Plummer. 
One of Theatre Museum Canada's ongoing projects is the Legends Library, which consists of filmed interviews of Canadian theatre icons such as William Hutt and Robert LePage. In addition to their online exhibits, the museum tours exhibits to various venues in Toronto. 
On August 30, 2011, David Mirvish announced that a space of 9,675 square feet was to be allocated for the Museum in a "great location" in Toronto's theatre district. This location is 355 King Street West.
The museum will have a home in the new King Blue Condominium, Retail and Hotel project at King Street & Blue Jays Way. This is just down the street from The TIFF Bell Lightbox - and about 2 blocks away from the proposed Mirvish/Gehry Project.

Affiliations
The Museum is affiliated with: CMA,  CHIN, and Virtual Museum of Canada.

External links
 Theatre Museum Canada - official site
 Theatre Museum Canada at Google Cultural Institute

References

Museums in Toronto
Proposed museums in Canada
Theatre museums
Theatre in Canada